Beach Girls is a Tamil reality show that premiered on Raj TV. In the program, the Tamil television industry celebrities share their lifetime experiences and achievements. Season 1 ran from 29 October 2012 to 19 March 2013 and Season 2 ran from 5 July 2014 to 25 October 2014.

External links
 Raj TV Official Site 

Raj TV television series
Tamil-language television shows
Tamil-language talk shows
2013 Tamil-language television series debuts
2010s Tamil-language television series
2014 Tamil-language television series endings